Taftan County is in Sistan and Baluchestan province, Iran. The capital of the county is the city of Nukabad. At the 2006 census, the region's population (as Nukabad District of Khash County) was 38,372 in 8,436 households. The following census in 2011 counted 36,506 people in 8,678 households. At the 2016 census, the district's population was 44,176 in 12,601 households.

Administrative divisions

The population history of Taftan County's administrative divisions (as Nukabad District of Khash County) over three consecutive censuses is shown in the following table.

References

Counties of Sistan and Baluchestan Province

fa:شهرستان تفتان